Smalley is a village on the main A608 Heanor to Derby road in Derbyshire in the East Midlands of England. The population of the civil parish as of the 2011 census was 2,784.

Smalley is part of the borough of Amber Valley and has its own parish council. Smalley village is central west within the wider parish area which contains other villages - Heanor Gate to the far north which merges into the town of Heanor, Smalley Green south of Smalley and Woodside to the far south. Facilities in the area include a primary school at Smalley, and a college and industrial estate at Heanor Gate.

History
Smalley's name came from the Anglo-Saxon Smæl-lēah = "narrow woodland clearing". It was mentioned in a charter of 1009 by King Æþelræd Unræd ("Ethelred the Unready") relating to a manor known as Westune (modern-day Weston-on-Trent) which land included the areas now known as Shardlow, Great Wilne, Church Wilne, Crich, Smalley, Morley, Weston and Aston-on-Trent. Under this charter Ethelred gave his minister, Morcar, some exemptions from tax.

Smalley's Parish Church of St John the Baptist was built in the late 18th century on the site of a much earlier church. The transepts were added in 1844 and the unusual and almost detached tower was added some years later. A 7th-century Saxon cross is part of the porch. The bell tower was built to house five bells donated by Rev. Charles Kerry and the chime of five bells is said to be the heaviest in England, the largest bell weighing over 2 tons. The parish church hosts occasional street parties for the residents of Smalley.

Its pub, the Bell Inn, was voted "Best Derbyshire Pub of 2006".

Sport and leisure
Stainsby Hall Cricket Club have their ground at the end of St. John's Road in Smalley and have been playing in the Derbyshire County League first division since 2008.  The name comes from the fact that they used to play their matches on a pitch in front of the now-demolished Stainsby House, just over the parish border in Horsley Woodhouse, but just a few hundred yards from their current ground.

See also
Listed buildings in Smalley, Derbyshire

References

External links
Page on Smalley's history
Smalley location map
Smalley on GENUKI

Villages in Derbyshire
Geography of Amber Valley